In music theory and harmonic analysis, a synthetic chord is a made-up or non-traditional (synthetic) chord (collection of pitches) which cannot be analyzed in terms of traditional harmonic structures, such as the triad or seventh chord.

However, synthetic chords originated not with Roslavets but with musicologist Sabaneev and his study of composer Scriabin's Prometheus published in 1910. See: Mystic chord.

For example, if a composer uses a synthetic scale as the basis for a passage of music and constructs chords from its tones, in much the same way that a tonal composer may use a major or minor scale's notes to build harmonies, then the resulting chords may be synthetic chords and referred to as such. 

Some synthetic chords may be analyzed as traditional chords,  including the Prometheus chord, which may be analyzed as an altered dominant chord.

An example of a synthetic chord would be the repeated chord in the first act of Puccini's Turandot at the beginning of the text passage "Non indugiare, se chiami appare...".

See also
Synthetic mode

References

Post-tonal music theory